"Face the Change" is a song by the Japanese J-pop group Every Little Thing, released as the group's seventh single on January 7, 1998. It was their second single to top the Oricon chart.

Composition
"Face the Change" is written in the key of G-sharp minor, has a tempo of 124 beats per minute, and the chorus follows a chord progression of E–F#–G#m–E–F#–B–D#–E–F#–G#m–E–F#–G#m.

Track listing
 Face the Change (Words & music - Mitsuru Igarashi) 
 Face the Change (Dub's Every Little Theme remix)
 Face the Change (instrumental)

Chart positions

Remixes
"Melodic Remix" by Luca Degani and Sergio Dall'ora : Super Eurobeat Presents Euro Every Little Thing
"Eurobeat Remix" by Sergio Dall'ora and Luca Degani : J-Euro Non-Stop Best

References

External links
 Face the Change information at Avex Network.
 Face the Change information at Oricon.

1998 singles
Every Little Thing (band) songs
Oricon Weekly number-one singles
Songs written by Mitsuru Igarashi